Repenning is a surname. Notable people with the surname include:

 Alexander Repenning, American computer scientist
 Charles Repenning (1922–2005), American paleontologist and zoologist
 Nelson Repenning, American business scholar